Ugni myricoides is a species of shrub from Mexico (Hidalgo, Veracruz, Puebla, Oaxaca, Chiapas), Central America, South America (Guyana, Venezuela, Guyana, Colombia, Ecuador, Peru, NW Brazil (Amazonas + Roraima)).

Gallery

References

External links
 
 

Shrubs
Myrtaceae